Izi was an important ancient Egyptian official of the Fourth Dynasty. His most important title was overseer of the treasury. Other important titles he hold are scribe of the king's document, overseer of the great house and overseer of the king's ornament. 

Izi is mainly known from different relief decorated blocks of his mastaba. These blocks are now in the Egyptian Museum (Cairo), in the Pushkin Museum and in the Ny Carlsberg Glyptotek. On the latter blocks he bears different titles making it possible that they belong to a different person with the name Izi. His mastaba was discovered around 1890 at Saqqara. In the same year Vladimir Golenishchev bought eight blocks in Cairo for the Pushkin Museum. On stylistical grounds of the reliefs, Izi dates most likely to the Fourth Dynasty.

References

Literature 

Overseer of the treasury
People of the Fourth Dynasty of Egypt